Lanthaler is a surname of South Tyrolean origin. Notable people with the surname include:

Christian Lanthaler, Italian para-alpine skier
Evelin Lanthaler (born 1991), Italian luger
Irmgard Lanthaler, Italian luger
Sandra Lanthaler (born 1984), Italian luger

Surnames of Italian origin